This page tracks the progress of the Lithuania men's national basketball team participating in EuroBasket 2015.

Main roster 
On May 5, head coach Jonas Kazlauskas published the extended 25–player main roster. The list did not included two long-time national team players: Simas Jasaitis and Kšyštof Lavrinovič. On July 9, the shortened roster was announced. All the mentioned players were invited to join the national team training camp in Palanga on July 20.

|valign=top|
Head coach
Jonas Kazlauskas

Assistant coach(es)
Darius Maskoliūnas
Gintaras Krapikas

Legend
Club – describes lastclub before the tournament
Age – describes ageon 30 August 2015

Candidates that did not make it to the final team

Depth chart

Preparation matches

Huawei Cup

Acropolis International Basketball Tournament

EuroBasket 2015

Preliminary round

Round of 16

Quarterfinal

Semifinal

Final

State awards
On September 22, 2015, the national team players, coaches and staff members were awarded with State awards and medals by Lithuania President Dalia Grybauskaitė. Although, many members were unable to receive new state awards because they were awarded in 2013 and the Lithuanian law requires a minimum of 3 years break before receiving a new one. Such members received presidential letters of thanks and gifts.

References

Lithuania
2015
Eurobasket